International Christian University – Kyiv (ICU-Kyiv) was a private university in Kyiv, Ukraine. It was founded in 1992 by Kyiv National Economic University and International University Vienna. In summer 2013 ICU-Kyiv didn't receive any applications from potential applicants and consequently closed that year following the bankruptcy of its Austrian founder International University Vienna in 2011.

Curriculum 
Student training is based on the standard programs of Ukrainian economic universities and programs of American Business universities.

ICU-Kyiv's curriculum combines professional education and liberal arts. The institution offers a Bachelor of Business Administration degree with a choice of three majors: Management, Marketing, International Economics. Before 2007 Management information systems was offered as well. Classes at ICU-Kyiv are conducted in English or Ukrainian and faculty includes American, British and Ukrainian instructors. University used American grading system:

References

External links
Official website (closed in 2013)
ICU-Kyiv Career Development Center on Facebook

Christian universities and colleges
Private universities and colleges in Ukraine
Universities and colleges in Kyiv
Educational institutions established in 1992
1992 establishments in Ukraine